The following is a list of highways numbered 973:

Canada
  in Quebec

United States
  in Florida
  in Kentucky
  in Louisiana
  in Maryland
  in Pennsylvania
  in Puerto Rico
  in Texas